A list of Macedonian Bulgarians.

Actors
 Krastyo Sarafov (1876–1952)
 Katya Paskaleva (1945–2002)

Architects
 Andrey Damyanov (1813–1878) 
 Naum Torbov (1880–1952)

Businessmen
 Kiradjieff brothers
 Kroum Pindoff (born 1915)

Clerics
 Paisiy Hilendarski  (1722–1773)
 Kiril Peychinovich (1770–1865) 
 Pavel Bozhigrobski (1780–1871)
 Neofit Rilski (1793–1881)
 Parteniy Zografski (1818–1876)
 Nathanael of Ohrid (1820–1906)
 Lazar Mladenov (1854–1917)

Composers
 Atanas Badev (1860–1908)

Diplomats 
 Dimitar Rizov (1862–1918)
 Nikola Stoyanov (1874–1967)
 Simeon Radev (1879–1967)

Film directors
 Boris Borozanov (1897–1951)

Literature

 Hristofor Zhefarovich (18th-century)
 Miladinov brothers (1810–1862)
 Marko Tsepenkov (1829–1920)
 Grigor Parlichev (1830–1893) 
 Kuzman Shapkarev (1834–1909)
 Yordan Hadzhikonstantinov-Dzhinot (1818–1882)
 Rayko Zhinzifov (1839–1877) 
 Krste Misirkov (1874–1926)
 Voydan Popgeorgiev - Chernodrinski (1875–1951)
 Hristo Silyanov (1880–1939)
 Dimitar Talev (1898–1966)
 Hristo Smirnenski (1898–1923)
 Atanas Dalchev, (1904–1978) 
 Nikola Vaptsarov (1909–1942)
 Venko Markovski (1915–1988)
 Krastyo Hadzhiivanov (1929–1952)

Military leaders 
 Kliment Boyadzhiev (1861–1933)
 Krastyu Zlatarev (1864–1925)
 Konstantin Zhostov (1867–1916)
 Boris Drangov (1872–1917)
 Petar Darvingov (1875–1958)
 Kiril Yanchulev (1896–1961)

Politicians
 Dimitar Blagoev (1856–1924)
 Andrey Lyapchev (1866–1933)
 Dimitar Vlahov (1878–1953)
 Iliya Kotsarev (1884–1954)
 Georgi Kulishev (1885–1974)
 Spiro Kitinchev (1895–1946)
 Georgi Traykov (1898–1975)
 Anton Yugov (1904–1991)
 Metodi Shatorov (1897–1944)
 Rosen Plevneliev (born 1964)

Revolutionaries

 Chavdar Voyvoda (16th-century)
 Ilyo Voyvoda (1822–1900)
 Hristo Makedonski (1835–1916) 
 Dimitar Popgeorgiev (1840–1907)
 Georgi Izmirliev (1851–1876)
 Trayko Kitanchev (1858–1895)
 Kosta Shahov (1862–1917)
 Gyorche Petrov (1864–1921)
 Pere Toshev (1865–1912)
 Aleksandar Protogerov (1867–1928)
 Dzole Stojchev (1867–1909)  
 Andon Dimitrov (1867–1933)
 Petar Poparsov (1868–1941)
 Hristo Tatarchev (1869–1952)
 Ivan Hadzhinikolov (1869–1934)
 Apostol Petkov (1869–1911) 
 Dame Gruev (1871–1906)
 Boris Sarafov (1872–1907)
 Gotse Delchev (1872–1903)
 Kiryak Shkurtov (1872–1965) 
 Hristo Matov (1872–1922)
 Aleksandar Turundzhev (1872–1905)
 Yane Sandanski (1872–1915)
 Vasil Chekalarov (1874–1913)
 Cyril Parlichev (1875–1944)
 Metody Patchev (1875–1902)
 Dimo Hadzhidimov (1875–1924)
 Nikola Karev (1877–1905) 
 Slaveyko Arsov (1877–1904)
 Kosta Tsipushev (1877–1968)
 Mile Pop Yordanov (1877–1901)
 Lazar Poptraykov (1878–1903)
 Hristo Uzunov (1878–1905)
 Vasil Adzhalarski (1880–1909)
 Ivan Antonov (1880–1928)
 Manush Georgiev (1881–1908)
 Todor Aleksandrov (1881–1924)
 Petar Chaulev (1882–1924)
 Pavel Shatev (1882–1951)
 Panko Brashnarov (1883–1951)
 Andon Kyoseto (1885–1953)
 Hristo Batandzhiev (died 1913)
 Hristo Andonov (1887–1928) 
 Ivan Mihailov (1896–1990)
 Jordan Chkatrov (1898–1945) 
 Nikola Pitu Gulev (1901–1923)
 Mara Buneva (1902–1928) 
 Andon Kalchev (1910–1948)
 Georgi Dimchev (1916–1980)

Scholars 
 Lyubomir Miletich (1863–1937)
 Aleksander Balabanov (1879–1955) 
 Nikola Milev (1881–1925)
 Blagoy Shklifov (1935–2003)

Singers 
 Iliya Argirov (1932–2012)
 Lyubka Rondova (born 1936)
 Radomir Radojkov (born 1936)

Sport 
 Spiro Debarski (born 1933)
 Nikola Kovachev (1934–2009)
 Vasil Metodiev (born 1935)
 Boris Gaganelov (born 1941)
 Aleksandar Tomov (born 1949)
 Stoycho Mladenov (born 1957)
 Ivan Lebanov (born 1957)
 Simeon Shterev (born 1959)
 Krasimir Bezinski (born 1961)
 Kiril Georgiev (born 1965)
 Petar Mihtarski (born 1966)
 Ivaylo Andonov (born 1967)
 Stoycho Stoilov (born 1971)
 Dimtcho Beliakov (born 1971)
 Irina Nikulchina (born 1974)
 Serafim Barzakov (born 1975)
 Georgi Bachev (born 1977)
 Dimitar Berbatov (born 1981)
 Kiril Terziev (born 1983)
 Borislav Hazurov (born 1985)
 Kostadin Hazurov (born 1985)
 Stanislav Manolev (born 1985)
 Iliyan Mitsanski (born 1985)

Others 
 Daskal Kamche (1790–1848)
 Baba Vanga (1911–1996)

References

Macedonian Bulgarians
Macedonian
Bulgarian
Bulgarian